Qaqa Rumi Kunka (Quechua qaqa rock, rumi stone, kunka throat, gullet, "rock stone throat", also spelled Cajarumicunca) is a mountain in the Cordillera Negra in the Andes of Peru which reaches a height of approximately . It is located in the Ancash Region, Huaylas Province, Pamparomas District, and in the Yungay Province, Quillo District.

References

Mountains of Peru
Mountains of Ancash Region